Arabic Industrial Development and Mining Organization (AIDMO)()

History
In a summit in Kuwait in 1966 the Arab League decided to establish an organization to improve and develop the industry in general. The decision was approved by the Council of Arab Economic Unity in 1968 and Arab Standardization and Metrology Organization was formed and the headquarters was established in Cairo.

In 1975, the Arab Ministries of Industries freed the organization from the Arab League influence and it became an independent organization, under Arab Industrial Development and Mining Organization. The organization's headquarters was moved from Cairo to Tunis temporarily from 1979 to 1980.

Members
There are 21 members in the AIDMO, all are members in the Arab League.

See also
Arab League
Arab Monetary Fund
Council of Arab Economic Unity (CAEU)

Arab League
Industrial development agencies
Arab organizations